Raoul Ponchon (born 30 December 1848 in La Roche-sur-Yon, France, died 3 December 1937 in Paris, France) was a French poet. A friend of Arthur Rimbaud, he was one of only "seven known recipients" of the first edition of A Season in Hell.
He was a contributor to the satirical weekly Le Courrier français.

See also
Nina de Villard de Callias
Zutiste

References

Sources

External links
 
 

1848 births
1937 deaths
20th-century French non-fiction writers
French poets
French male poets
20th-century French male writers